William Benton Piercy (May 2, 1896 – August 28, 1951), born in El Monte, California, was a pitcher for the New York Yankees (1917 and 1921), Boston Red Sox (1922–24) and Chicago Cubs (1926).

Piercy helped the Yankees win the 1921 American League pennant.

In 6 seasons, he had a 27–43 win–loss record, 116 games (70 started), 28 complete games, 2 shutouts, 30 games finished,  innings pitched, 676 hits allowed, 362 runs allowed, 289 earned runs allowed, 16 home runs allowed, 268 walks allowed, 165 strikeouts, 43 hit batsmen, 21 wild pitches, 2180 batters faced, 1 balk, and a 4.26 ERA.

He died in Long Beach, California, at the age of 55.

Sources

1896 births
1951 deaths
Major League Baseball pitchers
New York Yankees players
Boston Red Sox players
Chicago Cubs players
Baseball players from California
People from El Monte, California
Hastings Reds players
Stockton Millers players
Venice Tigers players
Vernon Tigers players
Salt Lake City Bees players
Toledo Iron Men players
St. Paul Saints (AA) players
Sacramento Senators players
Los Angeles Angels (minor league) players
Chattanooga Lookouts players
Memphis Chickasaws players
Wichita Aviators players
Denver Bears players